The British Association of Barbershop Singers (BABS) is a British organisation of male barbershop singers. It was formed in 1974 and is affiliated with the Barbershop Harmony Society.

Every year the association runs two contests in parallel for barbershop choruses and quartets as part of the BABS Annual Convention. The British convention is the largest barbershop convention of its kind outside of North America. The chorus competition is currently held over one day, while the quartet competition is spread over the convention weekend (with a preliminary round to eliminate all but the top 16 quartets usually held about 6 months prior to the semi-finals).

Concurrent with the national quartet contest, BABS holds an International Quartet Qualifying Contest, which past BABS gold medal quartets may also enter, to determine qualification for the next year's BHS International Quartet contest. In conjunction with the preliminary quartet contest, BABS also holds Seniors Quartet and Youth Quartet contests; BHS is asked to permit the respective winners to compete in the subsequent corresponding international contest, subject to a qualifying score.

National contest winners (in the categories of chorus and quartet) by year are as follows:
{| class="wikitable"
|- style="background-color:#FFFF99;font-weight:bold"
| width="60" Height="12.75" align="center" valign="bottom" | Year
| width="205"  valign="bottom" | Chorus Champions
| width="205"  valign="bottom" | Quartet Champions
| valign="bottom" | Youth Quartet
| valign="bottom" | Seniors Quartet

|-
| height="12.75" align="center" valign="bottom" | 2021–22
|  valign="bottom" | Meantime Chorus
|  valign="bottom" | Limelight
|  valign="bottom" | Hot Ticket
|  valign="bottom" | Crown Derby

|-
| height="12.75" align="center" valign="bottom" | 2020
|  valign="bottom" colspan="4" | No competition

|-
| height="12.75" align="center" valign="bottom" | 2019
|  valign="bottom" | Hallmark of Harmony
|  valign="bottom" | Sound Hypothesis
|  valign="bottom" | Apollo II
|  valign="bottom" | Bagatelle

|-
| height="12.75" align="center" valign="bottom" | 2018
|  valign="bottom" | Cottontown Chorus
|  valign="bottom" | The Locksmiths
|  valign="bottom" | Northern Quarter
|  valign="bottom" | One Foot in the Stave

|-
| Height="12.75" align="center" valign="bottom" | 2017
|  valign="bottom" | The Great Western Chorus of Bristol
|  valign="bottom" | Portobello Road
|  valign="bottom" | Sound Hypothesis
|  valign="bottom" | Three 'n' Easy

|-
| Height="12.75" align="center" valign="bottom" | 2016
|  valign="bottom" | Cottontown Chorus
|  valign="bottom" | Finest Hour
|  valign="bottom" | 4 On Demand

|  valign="bottom" | South Parade

|-
| Height="12.75" align="center" valign="bottom" | 2015
|  valign="bottom" | The Great Western Chorus of Bristol
|  valign="bottom" | Tagline
|  valign="bottom" | Trailblazers
|  valign="bottom" | The Grand Dads

|-
| Height="12.75" align="center" valign="bottom" | 2014
|  valign="bottom" | Hallmark of Harmony
|  valign="bottom" | Park Street
|  valign="bottom" | Proper Sound
|  valign="bottom" | Figaro

|-
| Height="12.75" align="center" valign="bottom" | 2013
|  valign="bottom" | Cottontown Chorus
|  valign="bottom" | The Emerald Guard
|  valign="bottom" | Park Street
|  valign="bottom" | Soundcheck

|-
| Height="12.75" align="center" valign="bottom" | 2012
|  valign="bottom" | The Grand Central Chorus
|  valign="bottom" | iQ
|  valign="bottom" | Mach 4
|  valign="bottom" | Just In Time

|-
| Height="12.75" align="center" valign="bottom" | 2011
|  valign="bottom" | Cottontown Chorus
|  valign="bottom" | Crossfire
|  valign="bottom" | Mach 4
|  valign="bottom" | Rockaholix

|-
| Height="12.75" align="center" valign="bottom" | 2010
|  valign="bottom" | The Great Western Chorus of Bristol
|  valign="bottom" | Steel

|-
| Height="12.75" align="center" valign="bottom" | 2009
|  valign="bottom" | Cottontown Chorus
|  valign="bottom" | Evolution

|-
| Height="12.75" align="center" valign="bottom" | 2008
|  valign="bottom" | The Great Western Chorus of Bristol
|  valign="bottom" | Monkey Magic (now The Great British Barbershop Boys)

|-
| Height="12.75" align="center" valign="bottom" | 2007
|  valign="bottom" | Cottontown Chorus
|  valign="bottom" | Q.E.D.

|-
| Height="12.75" align="center" valign="bottom" | 2006
|  valign="bottom" | Cambridge Chord Company
|  valign="bottom" | Pitch Invasion

|-
| Height="12.75" align="center" valign="bottom" | 2005
|  valign="bottom" | Cottontown Chorus
|  valign="bottom" | The Works

|-
| Height="12.75" align="center" valign="bottom" | 2004
|  valign="bottom" | Cambridge Chord Company
|  valign="bottom" | Prime Time

|-
| Height="12.75" align="center" valign="bottom" | 2003
|  valign="bottom" | The Grand Central Chorus
|  valign="bottom" | Sound Crew

|-
| Height="12.75" align="center" valign="bottom" | 2002
|  valign="bottom" | Cambridge Chord Company
|  valign="bottom" | The Light Industrial Choral Society

|-
| Height="12.75" align="center" valign="bottom" | 2001
|  valign="bottom" | The Grand Central Chorus
|  valign="bottom" | Matrix

|-
| Height="12.75" align="center" valign="bottom" | 2000
|  valign="bottom" | Hallmark of Harmony
|  valign="bottom" | The Likely Lads

|-
| Height="12.75" align="center" valign="bottom" | 1999
|  valign="bottom" | Cambridge Chord Company
|  valign="bottom" | Shockwave

|-
| Height="12.75" align="center" valign="bottom" | 1998
|  valign="bottom" | Shannon Express
|  valign="bottom" | Chordial Exchange

|-
| Height="12.75" align="center" valign="bottom" | 1997
|  valign="bottom" | Hallmark of Harmony
|  valign="bottom" | Cambridge Blues

|-
| Height="12.75" align="center" valign="bottom" | 1996
|  valign="bottom" | Grand Central Chorus
|  valign="bottom" | Hooked On Harmony

|-
| Height="12.75" align="center" valign="bottom" | 1995
|  valign="bottom" | Shannon Express
|  valign="bottom" | Smilin' Thru

|-
| Height="12.75" align="center" valign="bottom" | 1994
|  valign="bottom" | Hallmark of Harmony
|  valign="bottom" | Sound Assembly

|-
| Height="12.75" align="center" valign="bottom" | 1993
|  valign="bottom" | Grand Central Chorus
|  valign="bottom" | Island Engagement

|-
| Height="12.75" align="center" valign="bottom" | 1992
|  valign="bottom" | Rainy City Chorus
|  valign="bottom" | Quattro

|-
| Height="12.75" align="center" valign="bottom" | 1991
|  valign="bottom" | Hallmark of Harmony
|  valign="bottom" | Talk Of The Town

|-
| Height="12.75" align="center" valign="bottom" | 1990
|  valign="bottom" | The Great Western Chorus of Bristol
|  valign="bottom" | Curtain Call

|-
| Height="12.75" align="center" valign="bottom" | 1989
|  valign="bottom" | Hallmark of Harmony
|  valign="bottom" | Quartz Precision

|-
| Height="12.75" align="center" valign="bottom" | 1988
|  valign="bottom" | The Great Western Chorus of Bristol
|  valign="bottom" | High Time

|-
| Height="12.75" align="center" valign="bottom" | 1987
|  valign="bottom" | Pilgrimaires
|  valign="bottom" | Times Square

|-
| Height="12.75" align="center" valign="bottom" | 1986
|  valign="bottom" | Hallmark of Harmony
|  valign="bottom" | Junction 33

|-
| Height="12.75" align="center" valign="bottom" | 1985
|  valign="bottom" | Pilgrimaires
|  valign="bottom" | Gilt Edge

|-
| Height="12.75" align="center" valign="bottom" | 1984
|  valign="bottom" | Crawley Chordsmen
|  valign="bottom" | On Spec

|-
| Height="12.75" align="center" valign="bottom" | 1983
|  valign="bottom" | The Great Western Chorus of Bristol
|  valign="bottom" | Mancunian Way

|-
| Height="12.75" align="center" valign="bottom" | 1982
|  valign="bottom" | Roker Peers
|  valign="bottom" | Limited Company

|-
| Height="12.75" align="center" valign="bottom" | 1981
|  valign="bottom" | The Great Western Chorus of Bristol
|  valign="bottom" | Regency Pride

|-
| Height="12.75" align="center" valign="bottom" | 1980
|  valign="bottom" | The Great Western Chorus of Bristol
|  valign="bottom" | Par Four

|-
| Height="12.75" align="center" valign="bottom" | 1979
|  valign="bottom" colspan="2" | No competition

|-
| Height="12.75" align="center" valign="bottom" | 1978
|  valign="bottom" | Crawley Chordsmen
|  valign="bottom" | Newtown Ringers

|-
| Height="12.75" align="center" valign="bottom" | 1977
|  valign="bottom" | The Great Western Chorus of Bristol
|  valign="bottom" | Fortunairs

|-
| Height="12.75" align="center" valign="bottom" | 1976
|  valign="bottom" | Crawley Chordsmen
|  valign="bottom" | The Barrytones

|-
| Height="12.75" align="center" valign="bottom" | 1975
|  valign="bottom" | Crawley Chordsmen
|  valign="bottom" | Five Bridge Four

|-
| Height="12.75" align="center" valign="bottom" | 1974
|  valign="bottom" | No competition
|  valign="bottom" | Ringleaders

|}

References

External links
BABS website

 
Barbershop music
A cappella musical groups
Cultural organisations based in the United Kingdom